UFC 201: Lawler vs. Woodley was a mixed martial arts event produced by the Ultimate Fighting Championship held on July 30, 2016, at Philips Arena in Atlanta, Georgia.

Background
This was the third event that the organization has hosted in Atlanta, following UFC 88 in September 2008 and UFC 145 in April 2012.

The event was headlined by a UFC Welterweight Championship bout between then champion Robbie Lawler and top contender Tyron Woodley.

A UFC Flyweight Championship bout between current champion Demetrious Johnson and challenger Wilson Reis was expected to serve as the co-main event. However, on July 8, it was announced that Johnson pulled out due to an undisclosed injury and the bout was rescheduled for UFC on Fox 24. Reis was expected to remain on the card against promotional newcomer Sean Santella, but a few days later Santella announced the bout was scrapped because the UFC said "he needed to get more medicals done and there wasn't enough time". In turn, Reis faced Hector Sandoval, another newcomer.

Cláudio Silva was expected to face Siyar Bahadurzada at the event. However, on June 16, Silva pulled out due to injury and was replaced by Jorge Masvidal. In turn, Bahadurzada pulled out of the bout on July 12 citing an illness and was replaced by The Ultimate Fighter: United States vs. United Kingdom winner Ross Pearson.

Ray Borg was expected to face Fredy Serrano at the event, but pulled out on July 21 due to injury and was replaced by Ryan Benoit.

Justin Scoggins was expected to face Ian McCall in a flyweight bout. However, two days before the event, Scoggins announced he was struggling during the weight cut and was not going to make the contracted weight. The UFC pulled Scoggins and canceled the bout and McCall still weighed in as an alternate. Scoggins announced he will move to bantamweight for his next fight. As a result, McCall reportedly received his fight purse and a "win" bonus.

Results

Bonus awards
The following fighters were awarded $50,000 bonuses:
Fight of the Night: Karolina Kowalkiewicz vs. Rose Namajunas
Performance of the Night: Tyron Woodley and Jake Ellenberger

Reported payout
The following is the reported payout to the fighters as reported to the Georgia Athletic and Entertainment Commission. It does not include sponsor money and also does not include the UFC's traditional "fight night" bonuses.

Tyron Woodley: $340,000 (includes $70,000 win bonus) def. Robbie Lawler: $500,000
Karolina Kowalkiewicz: $38,000 (includes $19,000 win bonus) def. Rose Namajunas: $46,000
Jake Ellenberger: $150,000 (includes $75,000 win bonus) def. Matt Brown: $73,000
Érik Pérez: $48,000 (includes $24,000 win bonus) def. Francisco Rivera: $23,000
Ryan Benoit: $26,000 (includes $13,000 win bonus) def. Fredy Serrano: $12,000
Nikita Krylov: $48,000 (includes $24,000 win bonus) def. Ed Herman: $51,000
Jorge Masvidal: $114,000 (includes $57,000 win bonus) def. Ross Pearson: $54,000
Anthony Hamilton: $32,000 (includes $16,000 win bonus) def. Damian Grabowski: $18,000
Wilson Reis: $50,000 (includes $25,000 win bonus) def. Hector Sandoval: $12,000
Michael Graves: $12,000 vs. Bojan Veličković: $14,000 ^
Damien Brown: $20,000 (includes $10,000 win bonus) def. Cesar Arzamendia: $10,000

^ Both fighters earned show money; bout declared draw.

Aftermath
On August 18, it was announced that USADA informed Francisco Rivera of a potential Anti-Doping Policy violation stemming from an out-of-competition sample collection on July 23. Additional information will be provided at the appropriate time as the process moves forward.

See also
List of UFC events
2016 in UFC

References

Ultimate Fighting Championship events
2016 in mixed martial arts
Mixed martial arts in Georgia (U.S. state)
Sports competitions in Atlanta
2016 in Georgia (U.S. state)
July 2016 sports events in the United States
Events in Atlanta